"In a Heartbeat" is a pop song by German singer Sandra, written by Toby Gad and Jim Dyke, and produced by Jens Gad. The song was released in March 2009 as the lead single from Sandra's ninth studio album Back to Life. The single's B-sides were the album song "These Moments" and a non-album exclusive track "Kiss My...". No official music video has been filmed for the song. "In a Heartbeat" was a minor success on the German singles chart.

Track listing
CD maxi single/digital download
"In a Heartbeat" (Album Version) — 3:36
"In a Heartbeat" (NYC 38th Street Mix) — 5:21
"These Moments" (Album Version) — 3:29
"Kiss My..." — 3:07

Charts

References

External links
 "In a Heartbeat" at Discogs
 The official Sandra channel at YouTube

2009 singles
2009 songs
Sandra (singer) songs
Song recordings produced by Jens Gad
Songs written by Jim Dyke
Songs written by Toby Gad
Virgin Records singles